Pinole Valley High School is a high school in Pinole, California, United States, in Contra Costa County. First opened in 1967, the school is part of the West Contra Costa Unified School District. Pinole Valley High serves grades 9–12, and has approximately 1,200 students from Pinole, northwest Richmond and the unincorporated communities of Bayview, Montalvin Manor and Tara Hills. The school is noted for its girls' basketball team. Coach Dan O'Shea was named "Coach of the Year" in May 2006 by the Oakland Tribune.

Curriculum

Academic Study Programs 
Pinole Valley High offers several programs for students, such as Advanced Placement classes, CPA Career Academy classes offered through its Health and Engineering academies, Jazz Band, Choir, Piano, American Sign Language, and award-winning Performing and Visual Arts programs.

In 2019, Pinole Valley High School gained status as an International Baccalaureate World School. Pinole Valley High School will be the only high school in West Contra Costa Unified School District to have the International Baccalaureate program and the second high school in Contra Costa County, with Ygnacio Valley High School to have the rigorous program. The PVHS IB Diploma Programme offers IB class selections starting in the 2020–2021 school year.

Notable Music Program 
The school has a notable music program as well. The Spartan Marching Band performs in several Pinole events and used to, on a larger scale, in venues such as the San Francisco Chinese New Year Parade and Disneyland in Anaheim, California.

The End to "Portable Valley High" 
Pinole Valley High School was dubbed "Portable Valley High" by the students and community as the high school had been housed in temporary portables at the site of Creekside Park. The temporary campus served high-school students in Pinole and surrounding areas for over five years from 2014 until 2019. The temporary campus was plagued with problems such as rodent infestations, constant disrepair and flooding, which came to an end as the new campus came into fruition.

After five years, a temporary campus, and over $200 million, Pinole Valley High School opened its new campus on August 12, 2019 with Principal Kibby Kleiman in tow to cut the ribbon.

Historical economic problems

In 2004, the school district announced that it would eliminate all high school sports, close all libraries and lay off all music teachers and counselors in its $180 million budget for 2004–05.

Notable alumni

 Denzil Foster, Record Producer/Songwriter
 Billie Joe Armstrong, Lead Singer of Green Day (attended but did not graduate)
 Jeff Becerra, Lead Singer of Possessed
 Darrick Brilz, National Football League player
 Thomas DeCoud, National Football League player
 Mike Dirnt, Bassist for Green Day
 Jocelyn Enriquez, Singer
 Travis Feeney, National Football League player, Pittsburgh Steelers
 Jeff Harris, Major League Baseball player
 Nathan Haynes, Major League Baseball player
 Iamsu!, Rapper
 P-Lo, Producer/Rapper
 Larry LaLonde, Guitarist for Primus and Possessed
 Chris Singleton, Major League Baseball player
 Dale Sveum, Major League Baseball player and manager
 Gino Torretta, Heisman Award winner, National Football League player

References

External links

School website
School District website
Pinole Valley High School at greatschools.net
Pinole Valley High School at localschooldirectory.com

Pinole, California
High schools in Contra Costa County, California
Educational institutions established in 1967
Public high schools in California
1967 establishments in California